The  is a compact MPV built by Nissan mainly for the Japanese market.



Etymology 
The name was derived from the Italian word "festa", meaning holiday, festival or party, and according to the manufacturer "expresses a desire to spend an enjoyable time in the car together with family members or friends."

First generation (B30; 2004) 

It was unveiled on September 2, 2004 and first released on December 2, 2004, with a sales target of 5,000/month. The Lafesta shares a platform with the Renault Scénic and Renault Megane.

The Lafesta was the successor to the Nissan Prairie/Liberty and competed with the Toyota Isis, Honda Stream, Toyota WISH, Subaru Exiga, and the Mazda Premacy. The Lafesta also replaced the Nissan Avenir.

The vehicle offers sliding doors on both sides (one of which is power-assisted), Nissan's Intelligent key system, GPS navigation system, reverse camera and a very large sunroof. The only engine option available is a 2.0 L MR20DE inline-four unit. Both front- and four-wheel drive transmissions are available; the former uses a torsion beam suspension at the rear while the latter has a trailing arm multi-link arrangement.

The Lafesta is built at the same factory that once produced the larger Nissan Presage.

In 2007, the Lafesta received a minor facelift.

The first generation Lafesta was discontinued in Japan on December 26, 2012, after being sold alongside the second generation, with it being rebranded as the Lafesta Joy.

Second generation (B35; 2011) 

The second generation Lafesta is a version of the third generation Mazda Premacy supplied to Nissan by Mazda on an original equipment manufacturer (OEM) basis. Mazda supplied the Premacy for use in the Nissan Lafesta Highway Star beginning in May 2011. Unlike the Premacy, the new Nissan Lafesta Highway Star ditches the Nagare design.

Japanese models went on sale on June 15, 2011. Models available include Highway Star (J, G and G Supuremo).

Discontinuation
Following the discontinuation of the Mazda Premacy, sales of the Nissan Lafesta Highway Star ended on March 24, 2018.

References

External links

 Nissan Lafesta (Global)
 Nissan LAFESTA (Japanese)

Lafesta
Vehicles with CVT transmission
Cars introduced in 2004
2010s cars
All-wheel-drive vehicles
Front-wheel-drive vehicles
Minivans